Bocoum is a surname. Notable people with the surname include:

Afel Bocoum (born 1955), Malian musician
Baréma Bocoum (1914–1973), Malian politician and diplomat
Jacqueline Fatima Bocoum, Senegalese journalist and author
Marie-Thérèse Bocoum, Central African historian and diplomat